William Herbert Wood (4 November 1869 – 30 May 1953) was an Australian politician.

Born at Wallhollow, Victoria, to storekeeper Henry Gibson Wood, he attended schools in Victoria and Sydney before completing his secondary education at Sydney Grammar School and studying law at the University of Sydney. He entered his father's business and became an accountant. In 1894 he was elected to the New South Wales Legislative Assembly as the member for Eden-Bombala; he was a Protectionist from 1895 to 1901, an Independent from 1901 to 1904 and a Liberal thereafter. He was a captain in the 1st Australian Light Horse Regiment in 1900. Eden-Bombala was abolished in 1904 and split between Monaro and Bega and Wood chose to contest Bega, which he represented until 1913. Wood served as Minister of Justice in the Lyne ministry from 1899 to 1901 and Colonial Secretary in the Wade ministry from 1907 to 1910, concurrently holding the portfolios of Minister for Labour and Industry from 1907 to 1908 and Secretary for Mines from 1908 to 1910.

On 18 March 1909 he married Lillian Young  French at St James' Church, Sydney, and they divorced in 1924.

Wood died at Rydalmere in 1953 (aged 83).

References

 

1869 births
1953 deaths
Protectionist Party politicians
Members of the New South Wales Legislative Assembly
Politicians from Sydney
University of Sydney alumni
Australian Army soldiers